Abdullah Yahya al-Sallal (January 9, 1917 – March 5, 1994) was the leader of the North Yemeni Revolution of 1962. He served as the first President of the Yemen Arab Republic from 27 September 1962 to 5 November 1967.

Early life
Al-Sallal was born in the village of Sha'asan, Sanhan district, in Sanaa Governorate. His father died when he was young. Al-Sallal was sent to the only orphanage in Sanaa, known as the Orphan School, which later became famous for raising many of Yemen's greatest patriots and some of the most influential politicians of that era.

In the late 1930s, he completed his military education in Baghdad, Iraq. He became a second lieutenant at this time.

Though not a member of the social elite in Yemen, Al-Sallal was widely respected by the military community as a competent and brazen officer despite being the son of a butcher, a profession looked down upon prior to the revolution.

Political career

Al-Sallal led the revolutionary forces that deposed King Muhammad al-Badr and brought the Mutawakkilite Kingdom of Yemen to an end. He presided over the newly founded Yemen Arab Republic (YAR), with close ties to Gamal Abdel Nasser of Egypt which served as the Yemen Arab Republic's strongest ally in the war against the Saudi Arabian-backed Mutawakkilite royalists that lasted into 1970. 

Yemen's President Abdullah al-Sallal negotiated with tribal leaders after the revolution to help cement the republic. He was later ousted in a bloodless coup led by Abdul Rahman Al-Iryani and exiled to Egypt, where he remained until President Ali Abdullah Saleh invited him to return in the early 1980s.  

Six different men held the position of Prime Minister under Al-Sallal, including Al-Sallal himself three times. He held both titles from the formation of the republic until 26 April 1963, when he appointed Abdul Latif Dayfallah, as well as briefly in 1965 and from 18 September 1966 until the end of his presidency. Abdul Rahman al-Eryani, al-Sallal's successor to the presidency in 1967, served as Prime Minister in 1963 and 1964. Hassan al-Amri held the post three times.

References

External links 
 

1917 births
1994 deaths
Field marshals of Yemen
People from Sanaa
Presidents of North Yemen
Prime Ministers of North Yemen
Yemeni Arab nationalists
Leaders ousted by a coup
People of the North Yemen Civil War
20th-century Yemeni military personnel
Burials in Yemen
Yemeni revolutionaries
Iraqi Military Academy alumni